Shooting sports at the 1994 Asian Games was held in Hiroshima, Japan between 7 and 14 October 1994.

Medalists

Men

Women

Medal table

References 

 ISSF Results Overview
 New Straits Times, October 7–15, 1994

External links
Asian Shooting Federation

 
1994 Asian Games events
1994
Asian Games
1994 Asian Games